"Up Till Dawn (On the Move)" is a song by Dutch DJ duo Lucas & Steve. It was released on 28 April 2017 by Spinnin' Records.

Background
The track from Barthezz dance classic ‘On The Move’, Lucas & Steve remixed the track to 'Up Till Dawn (On the Move)'.

Composition
We Rave You said: "the track is the perfect feel-good soundtrack, with smooth guitar licks, infectiously catchy vocals and uplifting chords."

Charts

Weekly charts

Year-end charts

References

2017 singles
2017 songs
Spinnin' Records singles